

Peerage of England

|Duke of Cornwall (1337)||Edward, the Black Prince||1337||1376|| 
|-
|rowspan="2"|Earl of Surrey (1088)||John de Warenne, 7th Earl of Surrey||1304||1347||Died
|-
|Richard FitzAlan, 8th Earl of Surrey||1347||1376||10th Earl of Arundel
|-
|Earl of Warwick (1088)||Thomas de Beauchamp, 11th Earl of Warwick||1315||1369||
|-
|Earl of Arundel (1138)||Richard FitzAlan, 10th Earl of Arundel||1331||1376||Succeeded to the senior Earldom of Surrey, see above
|-
|Earl of Oxford (1142)||John de Vere, 7th Earl of Oxford||1331||1360||
|-
|Earl of Hereford (1199)||Humphrey de Bohun, 6th Earl of Hereford||1336||1361||
|-
|Earl of Lincoln (1217)||Alice de Lacy, 4th Countess of Lincoln||1311||1348||Died, title extinct
|-
|rowspan="2"|Earl of Leicester (1265)||Henry Plantagenet, 3rd Earl of Leicester and Lancaster||1326||1345||Died
|-
|Henry of Grosmont, 4th Earl of Leicester and Lancaster||1345||1361||Created Earl of Lincoln in 1349
|-
|Earl of Richmond (1306)||John III, Duke of Brittany||1334||1341||Died, peerage reverted to the Crown
|-
|Earl of Norfolk (1312)||none||1338||1375||
|-
|Earl of Kent (1321)||John, 3rd Earl of Kent||1331||1352||
|-
|Earl of March (1328)||none||1330||1354||Attainted
|-
|rowspan="2"|Earl of Devon (1335)||Hugh de Courtenay, 1st Earl of Devon||1335||1340||Died
|-
|Hugh de Courtenay, 2nd Earl of Devon||1340||1377||
|-
|rowspan="2"|Earl of Salisbury (1337)||William Montagu, 1st Earl of Salisbury||1337||1344||Died
|-
|William de Montacute, 2nd Earl of Salisbury||1344||1397||
|-
|Earl of Derby (1337)||Henry of Grosmont||1337||1361||Succeeded to the more senior Earldom of Leicester, see above
|-
|Earl of Gloucester (1337)||Hugh de Audley, 1st Earl of Gloucester||1337||1347||Died, Earldom extinct, Barony Audly succeeded by his daughter, see below
|-
|Earl of Huntingdon (1337)||William de Clinton, 1st Earl of Huntingdon||1337||1354||
|-
|Earl of Northampton (1337)||William de Bohun, 1st Earl of Northampton||1337||1360||
|-
|Earl of Suffolk (1337)||Robert d'Ufford, 1st Earl of Suffolk||1337||1369||
|-
|rowspan="2"|Earl of Pembroke (1339)||Laurence Hastings, 1st Earl of Pembroke||1339||1348||Died
|-
|John Hastings, 2nd Earl of Pembroke||1348||1375||
|-
|Earl of Cambridge (1340)||William of Juliers, 1st Earl of Cambridge||1340||1361||New creation
|-
|Earl of Richmond (1341)||John of Montfort||1341||1342||New creation; Peerage resumed by the Crown
|-
|Earl of Richmond (1342)||John of Gaunt, 1st Earl of Richmond||1342||1372||New creation
|-
|rowspan="2"|Baron de Ros (1264)|| William de Ros, 2nd Baron de Ros ||1316||1342||Died
|-
|William de Ros, 3rd Baron de Ros||1342||1353||
|-
|Baron le Despencer (1264)||none||1326||1398||Attainted
|-
|rowspan="2"|Baron Basset of Drayton (1264)||Ralph Basset, 2nd Baron Basset of Drayton||1299||1343||Died
|-
|Ralph Basset, 3rd Baron Basset of Drayton||1343||1390||
|-
|Baron Basset of Sapcote (1264)||Simon Basset, 4th Baron Basset of Sapcote||1326||1360||Never summoned to Parliament
|-
|Baron Mowbray (1283)||John de Mowbray, 3rd Baron Mowbray||1322||1361||
|-
|Baron Astley (1295)||Thomas de Astley, 3rd Baron Astley||1314||1359||
|- 
|Baron Berkeley (1295)||Thomas de Berkeley, 3rd Baron Berkeley||1326||1361||
|- 
|Baron Corbet (1295)||John Corbet, 3rd Baron Corbet||1322||1347||Died, title extinct
|- 
|rowspan="2"|Baron Fauconberg (1295)||John de Fauconberg, 3rd Baron Fauconberg||1318||1349||Died
|- 
|Walter de Fauconberg, 4th Baron Fauconberg||1349||1362||
|- 
|Baron FitzWalter (1295)||John FitzWalter, 3rd Baron FitzWalter||1328||1361||
|- 
|rowspan="2"|Baron FitzWarine (1295)||Fulke FitzWarine, 2nd Baron FitzWarine||1315||1349||Died
|- 
|Fulke FitzWarine, 3rd Baron FitzWarine||1349||1373||
|- 
|rowspan="2"|Baron Grey de Wilton (1295)||Henry Grey, 3rd Baron Grey de Wilton||1323||1342||
|-
|Reginald Grey, 4th Baron Grey de Wilton||1323||1370||
|-
|rowspan="2"|Baron Hussee (1295)||Henry Hussee, 2nd Baron Hussee||1332||1349||
|- 
|Henry Hussee, 2nd Baron Hussee||1349||13??||Died shortly after 1349
|- 
|Baron Hylton (1295)||Alexander Hylton, 2nd Baron Hylton||1322||1360||
|- 
|Baron Mauley (1295)||Peter de Mauley, 2nd Baron Mauley||1310||1355||
|- 
|Baron Montfort (1295)||John de Montfort, 3rd Baron Montfort||1314||1367||
|- 
|Baron Neville de Raby (1295)||Ralph Neville, 2nd Baron Neville de Raby||1331||1367||
|- 
|Baron Poyntz (1295)||Nicholas Poyntz, 4thd Baron Poyntz||1333||1360||
|- 
|Baron Segrave (1295)||John de Segrave, 3rd Baron Segrave||1325||1353||
|- 
|Baron Umfraville (1295)||Gilbert de Umfraville, 3rd Baron Umfraville||1325||1381||
|- 
|rowspan="2"|Baron Wake (1295)||John Wake, 1st Baron Wake||1300||1349||Died
|- 
|Margaret Wake, 3rd Baroness Wake||1349||1349||Died; title succeeded by the Earl of Kent (see above), and held by his heirs until 1408, when it fell into abeyance
|- 
|Baron Bardolf (1299)||John Bardolf, 3rd Baron Bardolf||1328||1363||
|- 
|Baron Clinton (1299)||John de Clinton, 3rd Baron Clinton||1335||1398||
|- 
|rowspan="2"|Baron De La Warr (1299)||John la Warr, 2nd Baron De La Warr||1320||1347||Died
|- 
|Roger la Warr, 3rd Baron De La Warr||1347||1370||
|- 
|Baron Deincourt (1299)||William Deincourt, 2nd Baron Deincourt||1327||1364||
|- 
|Baron Ferrers of Chartley (1299)||Robert de Ferrers, 3rd Baron Ferrers of Chartley||1324||1350||
|- 
|Baron FitzPayne (1299)||Robert FitzPayne, 2nd Baron FitzPayne||1316||1354||
|- 
|Baron Grandison (1299)||Peter de Grandison, 2nd Baron Grandison||1335||1358||
|- 
|rowspan="2"|Baron Lovel (1299)||John Lovel, 3rd Baron Lovel||1314||1347||Died
|- 
|John Lovel, 4th Baron Lovel||1347||1361||
|- 
|Baron Mohun (1299)||John de Mohun, 2nd Baron Mohun||1330||1376||
|- 
|Baron Percy (1299)||Henry de Percy, 2nd Baron Percy||1315||1352||
|- 
|Baron Rivers of Ongar (1299)||John Rivers, 2nd Baron Rivers||1311||1350||
|- 
|Baron Scales (1299)||Robert de Scales, 3rd Baron Scales||1324||1369||
|- 
|Baron Stafford (1299)||Ralph de Stafford, 2nd Baron Stafford||1309||1372||
|- 
|Baron Tregoz (1299)||Thomas de Tregoz, 3rd Baron Tregoz||1322||1405||
|- 
|rowspan="2"|Baron Welles (1299)||Adam de Welles, 3rd Baron Welles||1320||1345||Died
|- 
|John de Welles, 4th Baron Welles||1345||1361||
|- 
|rowspan="2"|Baron Beauchamp of Somerset (1299)||John de Beauchamp, 2nd Baron Beauchamp||1336||1343||Died
|- 
|John de Beauchamp, 3rd Baron Beauchamp||1343||1361||
|- 
|Baron Cauntelo (1299)||Nicholas de Cauntelo, 3rd Baron Cauntelo||1321||1355||
|- 
|rowspan="2"|Baron de Clifford (1299)||Robert de Clifford, 3rd Baron de Clifford||1322||1344||Died
|- 
|Robert de Clifford, 4th Baron de Clifford||1344||1350||
|- 
|rowspan="2"|Baron Ferrers of Groby (1299)||Henry Ferrers, 2nd Baron Ferrers of Groby||1325||1343||Died
|- 
|William Ferrers, 3rd Baron Ferrers of Groby||1343||1372||
|- 
|Baron Furnivall (1299)||Thomas de Furnivall, 3rd Baron Furnivall||1339||1364||
|- 
|Baron Grendon (1299)||Robert Grendon, 2nd Baron Grendon||1331||1348||Died, right to Barony appears to have devolved on the issue of his only sister
|- 
|Baron Latimer (1299)||William Latimer, 4th Baron Latimer||1335||1381||
|- 
|Baron Morley (1299)||Robert de Morley, 2nd Baron Morley||1310||1360||
|- 
|Baron Saint John of Lageham (1299)||John St John, 3rd Baron Saint John of Lageham||1323||1349||Died, none of his heirs were summoned to Parliament in respect of this Barony
|- 
|rowspan="2"|Baron Strange of Knockyn (1299)||Roger le Strange, 4th Baron Strange of Knockyn||1324||1349||Died
|- 
|Roger le Strange, 5th Baron Strange of Knockyn||1349||1381||
|- 
|rowspan="2"|Baron Sudeley (1299)||John de Sudeley, 2nd Baron Sudeley||1336||1340||Died
|- 
|John de Sudeley, 3rd Baron Sudeley||1340||1367||
|- 
|Baron Botetourt (1305)||John de Botetourt, 2nd Baron Botetourt||1324||1385||
|- 
|Baron Boteler of Wemme (1308)||William Le Boteler, 2nd Baron Boteler of Wemme||1334||1361||
|- 
|Baron Grelle (1308)||Thomas de Grelle, 1st Baron Grelle||1308||1347||Died, Barony became extinct
|- 
|Baron Zouche of Haryngworth (1308)||William la Zouche, 1st Baron Zouche||1308||1352||
|- 
|rowspan="3"|Baron Beaumont (1309)||Henry Beaumont, 1st Baron Beaumont||1309||1340||Died
|- 
|John Beaumont, 2nd Baron Beaumont||1340||1342||Died
|- 
|Henry Beaumont, 3rd Baron Beaumont||1342||1369||
|- 
|rowspan="2"|Baron Everingham (1309)||Adam Everingham, 1st Baron Everingham||1309||1341||Died
|- 
|Adam Everingham, 2nd Baron Everingham||1341||1379||
|- 
|rowspan="2"|Baron Monthermer (1309)||Thomas de Monthermer, 2nd Baron Monthermer||1325||1340||Died
|- 
|Margaret de Monthermer, suo jure Baroness Monthermer||1340||1390||
|- 
|rowspan="3"|Baron Strange of Blackmere (1309)||John le Strange, 2nd Baron Strange of Blackmere||1324||1349||Died
|- 
|Fulk le Strange, 3rd Baron Strange of Blackmere||1349||1349||Died
|- 
|John le Strange, 4th Baron Strange of Blackmere||1349||1361||
|- 
|rowspan="2"|Baron Lisle (1311)||Robert de Lisle, 1st Baron Lisle||1311||1343||Died
|- 
|John de Lisle, 2nd Baron Lisle||1343||1356||
|- 
|Baron Nevill (1311)||John de Nevill, 2nd Baron Nevill||1336||1358||
|- 
|Baron Audley of Heleigh (1313)||James de Audley, 2nd Baron Audley of Heleigh||1316||1386||
|- 
|Baron Brun (1313)||Maurice le Brun, 1st Baron Brun||1313||1355||
|- 
|Baron Cobham of Kent (1313)||John de Cobham, 2nd Baron Cobham of Kent||1339||1355||
|- 
|Baron Northwode (1313)||Roger de Northwode, 2nd Baron Northwode||1319||1361||
|- 
|Baron Saint Amand (1313)||Almaric de St Amand, 2nd Baron Saint Amand||1330||1382||
|- 
|Baron Cherleton (1313)||John Cherleton, 1st Baron Cherleton||1313||1353||
|- 
|Baron Say (1313)||Geoffrey de Say, 2nd Baron Say||1322||1359||
|- 
|rowspan="2"|Baron Willoughby de Eresby (1313)||John de Willoughby, 2nd Baron Willoughby de Eresby||1317||1349||
|- 
|John de Willoughby, 3rd Baron Willoughby de Eresby||1349||1372||
|- 
|Baron Columbers (1314)||Philip de Columbers, 1st Baron Columbers||1314||1342||Died, Barony became extinct
|- 
|Baron Holand (1314)||Robert de Holland, 2nd Baron Holand||1328||1373||
|- 
|Baron Audley (1317)||Margaret de Audley, suo jure Baroness Audley||1347||1347-1351||
|- 
|Baron Strabolgi (1318)||David Strabolgi, 3rd Baron Strabolgi||1335||1375||
|- 
|Baron Arcedekne (1321)||John le Arcedekne, 2nd Baron Arcedekne||1329||1350||
|- 
|Baron Dacre (1321)||William Dacre, 2nd Baron Dacre||1339||1361||
|- 
|Baron FitzHugh (1321)||Henry FitzHugh, 1st Baron FitzHugh||1321||1356||
|- 
|Baron Greystock (1321)||William de Greystock, 2nd Baron Greystock||1323||1358||
|- 
|rowspan="2"|Baron Lucy (1321)||Anthony de Lucy, 1st Baron Lucy||1321||1343||Died
|- 
|Thomas de Lucy, 2nd Baron Lucy||1343||1365||
|- 
|rowspan="2"|Baron Aton (1324)||Gilbert de Aton, 1st Baron Aton||1324||1342||Died
|- 
|William de Aton, 2nd Baron Aton||1342||1373||
|- 
|Baron Grey of Ruthin (1325)||Roger Grey, 1st Baron Grey de Ruthyn||1324||1353||
|- 
|rowspan="2"|Baron Harington (1326)||John Harington, 1st Baron Harington||1324||1347||Died
|- 
|John Harington, 2nd Baron Harington||1347||1363||
|- 
|Baron Blount (1326)||William le Blount, 2nd Baron Blount||1330||aft. 1366||
|- 
|Baron Ingham (1328)||Oliver de Ingham, 1st Baron Ingham||1328||1344||Died, title fell into abeyance
|- 
|Baron Burghersh (1330)||Bartholomew de Burghersh, 1st Baron Burghersh||1330||1355||
|- 
|Baron Maltravers (1330)||John Maltravers, 1st Baron Maltravers||1330||1364||
|- 
|rowspan="2"|Baron Darcy de Knayth (1332)||John Darcy, 1st Baron Darcy de Knayth||1332||1347||Died
|- 
|John Darcy, 2nd Baron Darcy de Knayth||1347||1356||
|- 
|rowspan="2"|Baron Talbot (1332)||Gilbert Talbot, 1st Baron Talbot||1332||1346||Died
|- 
|Richard Talbot, 2nd Baron Talbot||1346||1356||
|- 
|Baron Verdon (1332)||John de Verdon, 1st Baron Verdon||1332||1342||Died, none of his heirs were summoned to Parliament in respect of this Barony
|- 
|Baron Sutton of Holderness (1332)||John Sutton, 2nd Baron Sutton of Holderness||1338||1356||
|- 
|rowspan="2"|Baron Meinell (1336)||William de Meinill, 1st Baron Meinill||1336||1342||Died
|- 
|Elizabet de Meinill, suo jure Baroness Meinill||1342||1368||
|- 
|Baron Leyburn (1337)||John de Leyburn, 1st Baron Leyburn||1337||1384||
|- 
|Baron Poynings (1337)||Michael de Poynings, 2nd Baron Poynings||1339||1369||
|- 
|Baron Chandos (1337)||Roger de Chandos, 1st Baron Chandos||1337||1353||
|- 
|Baron le Despencer (1338)||Hugh le Despencer, 1st Baron le Despencer||1338||1349||Died, Barony extinct
|- 
|Baron Grey of Rotherfield (1330)||John de Grey, 1st Baron Grey of Rotherfield||1338||1360||
|- 
|Baron Cobham of Sterborough (1342)||Reginald de Cobham, 1st Baron Cobham of Sterborough||1342||1361||New creation
|- 
|Baron Bradeston (1342)||Thomas de Bradeston, 1st Baron Bradeston||1342||1360||New creation
|- 
|rowspan="2"|Baron Bourchier (1342)||Robert Bourchier, 1st Baron Bourchier||1342||1349||New creation, died
|- 
|John Bourchier, 2nd Baron Bourchier||1349||1400||
|- 
|Baron Braose (1342)||Thomas de Braose, 1st Baron Braose||1342||1361||New creation
|- 
|Baron Bulmer (1342)||Ralph de Bulmer, 1st Baron Bulmer||1342||1357||New creation
|- 
|Baron Colevill (1342)||Robert de Colvill, 1st Baron Colvill||1342||1368||New creation
|- 
|Baron Montacute (1342)||Edward de Montacute, 1st Baron Montacute||1342||1361||New creation
|- 
|Baron Norwich (1342)||John de Norwich, 1st Baron Norwich||1342||1362||New creation
|- 
|Baron Strivelyn (1342)||John de Strivelyn, 1st Baron Strivelyn||1342||1378||New creation
|- 
|Baron Ughtred (1342)||Thomas Ughtred, 1st Baron Ughtred||1343||1365||New creation
|- 
|Baron Manny (1347)||Walter Manny, 1st Baron Manny||1347||1371||New creation
|- 
|Baron Dagworth (1347)||Thomas de Dagworth, 1st Baron Dagworth||1347||1359||New creation
|- 
|Baron Saint Philibert (1348)||John St Philibert, 1st Baron St Philibert||1348||1359||New creation
|- 
|Baron Hussee (1348)||John Hussee, 1st Baron Hussee||1348||1361||New creation
|- 
|Baron Balliol (1349)||Edward de Balliol, 1st Baron Balliol||1349||1363||New creation
|- 
|}

Peerage of Scotland

|Earl of Mar (1114)||Thomas, Earl of Mar||1332||1377||
|-
|Earl of Dunbar (1115)||Patrick V, Earl of March||1308||1368||
|-
|Earl of Fife (1129)||Donnchadh IV, Earl of Fife||1288||1353||
|-
|Earl of Menteith (1160)||Mary II, Countess of Menteith||1333||1360||
|-
|Earl of Lennox (1184)||Domhnall, Earl of Lennox||1333||1373||
|-
|Earl of Ross (1215)||Uilleam III, Earl of Ross||1334||1372||
|-
|Earl of Sutherland (1235)||William de Moravia, 5th Earl of Sutherland||1333||1370||
|-
|Earl of Moray (1312)||John Randolph, 3rd Earl of Moray||1332||1346||Died, title extinct
|-
|Earl of Angus (1330)||Thomas Stewart, 2nd Earl of Angus||1331||1361||
|-
|Earl of Wigtown (1341)||Malcolm Fleming, Earl of Wigtown||1341||1363||New creation
|-
|Earl of Atholl (1341)||William Douglas, 1st Earl of Atholl||1341||1341||New creation; resigned the Earldom
|-
|Earl of Atholl (1342)||Robert Stewart, 1st Earl of Atholl||1342||1371||New creation
|-
|Earl of Stratheran (1344)||Maurice de Moravia, Earl of Strathearn||1344||1346||New creation; died, title extinct
|-
|}

Peerage of Ireland

|Earl of Ulster (1264)||Elizabeth de Burgh, 4th Countess of Ulster||1333||1363||
|-
|Earl of Kildare (1316)||Maurice FitzGerald, 4th Earl of Kildare||1329||1390||
|-
|Earl of Ormond (1328)||James Butler, 2nd Earl of Ormond||1338||1382||
|-
|Earl of Desmond (1329)||Maurice FitzGerald, 1st Earl of Desmond||1329||1356||
|-
|Baron Athenry (1172)||Thomas de Bermingham||1322||1374||
|-
|Baron Kingsale (1223)||Miles de Courcy, 7th Baron Kingsale||1338||1358||
|-
|rowspan=2|Baron Kerry (1223)||John Fitzmaurice, 5th Baron Kerry||1339||1348||Died
|-
|Maurice Fitzmaurice, 6th Baron Kerry||1348||1398||
|-
|rowspan=2|Baron Barry (1261)||David Barry, 5th Baron Barry||1330||1347||Died
|-
|David Barry, 6th Baron Barry||1347||1392||
|-
|}

References

 

Lists of peers by decade
1340s in England
1340s in Ireland
14th century in Scotland
14th-century English people
14th-century Irish people
14th-century Scottish earls
1340 in Europe
14th century in England
14th century in Ireland
Peers